The West Hills are a  mountain range located in northeast Box Elder County, Utah, United States. The range is connected to the Samaria Mountains, a small range on the north in southern Idaho. The West Hills are also connected to another section on the southwest, the Blue Spring Hills. West of the Blue Spring and West Hills is a long north–south valley, the Blue Creek Valley.

The West and Blue Spring Hills also lie west of the south flowing Bear River (Great Salt Lake) which feeds into Bear River Bay of the Great Salt Lake's northeast.

Description
The West Hills are slightly northwest trending.

Routes
Interstate 15 parallels the mountain range on its east and southeast, following the south-flowing Malad River, a west tributary to the south-flowing Bear River.

Interstate 84 traverses the section between the Blue Spring Hills on the southwest, a route from Idaho (northwest), southeast to Tremonton and then Brigham City.

References

External links
 
 Limekiln Knoll, mountainzone.com (coordinates)

Mountain ranges of Box Elder County, Utah
Mountain ranges of Utah